Thirrupathi Brothers is an Indian Tamil film production company owned by brothers N. Subash Chandrabose and N. Lingusamy and was founded in 2006.

History
The first venture of Thirrupathi Brothers was Deepavali, directed by Ezhil with Jayam Ravi and Bhavana in lead roles. It was a moderate success. Then it was Pattalam, starring Nadhiya and a host of new faces.

The next venture, Paiyaa (2010) was directed by N. Lingusamy himself. The film brought together Karthi and Tamannaah and Bollywood actor Milind Soman. It showcased a journey the lead couple undertake on the request of the heroine. The ups and downs the duo undergo during the journey and how they bond during the same forms the story.

Lingusamy's next Vettai (2012) was also produced by Thirrupathi Brothers. It starred Madhavan, Arya, Sameera Reddy and Amala Paul. It is their highest-grossing film to date.

The banner's next offering Vazhakku Enn 18/9 was critically acclaimed. The film marked the comeback of Balaji Sakthivel after a brief hiatus. Hosting a number of newbies in the lead the movie with a realistic approach takes a dig on love and so called love among today's young intertwined with a MMS crime plot. It was remade in Malayalam as Black Butterflies and Kannada as Case No.18/9.

Thirrupathi Brothers produced Kumki (2012) with Prabhu Solomon which starred Vikram Prabhu in the lead and marked his foray in Tamil cinema. Thirrupathi Brothers also produced films like Ivan Veramathiri, Goli Soda, Manja Pai and Sathuranga Vettai.

Financial problems 
In 2014, Lingusamy produced Suriya-starrer Anjaan, which was directed by himself, and Kamal Haasan's Uttama Villain (2015), which was directed by Ramesh Aravind. The producer suffered losses, because of the failure of Anjaan, which affected the production of the latter. Hence, in order to overcome the losses, Thirrupathi Brothers, sold the rights of Uttama Villain and the Sivakarthikeyan-starrer Rajinimurugan (2015), to Eros International, and also borrowed money from local distributors, during the release of Uttama Villain. However, a week before its release, producer R. Thangaraj of Thangam Cinemas, filed a case to stay the release of the film, since Lingusamy had to pay an amount of  crore, to the producer. But, as per sources, the company has a deficit  crore, at the time of the release, which led to a wrangle between financiers and producers. Due to the dispute, the film which was initially slated to release on 1 May 2015, had a delayed release, leading to a loss of  crore. The film was a failure upon its release, leading to huge financial crisis for the production house.

The banner's next production Rajinimurugan, which was initially slated to release in September 2015, had a delay, because of the financial crisis, and the producer, who has to settle payment for Eros International, which ballooned the amount to 20 crore, after the failure of Uttama Villain. After setting disputes, the film was released in January 2016, and was a commercial success. But the financial crisis of the company, led to halt their other projects; Idam Porul Yaeval, which was directed by Seenu Ramasamy, starring Vijay Sethupathi and Vishnu Vishal, remained unreleased, and other two projects Ra Ra Rajashekhar and Naan Thaan Siva, were ultimately halted.

Filmography

References

External links
 Thirupathi Brothers

Mass media companies established in 2006
Indian film studios
Film production companies of Tamil Nadu
2006 establishments in Tamil Nadu
Indian companies established in 2006